Jennifer Ninel Toth (born ) is an English-born journalist and writer.

Early life and education
Toth was born in London to John and Paula Toth. Her father was a national security correspondent for the Los Angeles Times and later a senior associate at the Pew Research Center, while her mother was a lawyer and special advocate for the state of Maryland. Toth grew up in Moscow and Chevy Chase, Maryland. She received her undergraduate degree from Washington University in St. Louis before graduating from Columbia University with an M.A. in journalism.

Career
From 1990 to 1992, Toth worked as a journalist for the Los Angeles Times in Washington, D.C. and New York, and afterwards for the Raleigh News & Observer. Toth is married to Craig Whitlock, a journalist and national-security correspondent for the Washington Post.

In 1993, she published her study entitled The Mole People: Life in the Tunnels Beneath New York City, featuring interviews with some dwellers of the "Freedom Tunnel." Her life was threatened by one of the mole people whom she befriended, who thought she witnessed him killing a crack addict. She consequently fled New York City. The book, published by Chicago Review Press, became a worldwide best-seller, translated into Japanese, German, Italian, Spanish and Turkish.

Jim Dwyer, the author of Subway Lives, presented an influential review of The Mole People for the Washington Post on 25 October 1993. "The wilder stories are overshadowed by the far simpler and far more touching portraits Toth presents of injured people struggling for dignity and tenderness," Dwyer wrote. "Having aimed high, having strode beneath New York with a can of Mace from her father, and with a heart and head ready to listen, she has brought back a book of stories that no one else has told—a book that is honest and above all, loving, to people who are nobody's friends. We should all do so well."

In 1997, Toth published Orphans of the Living: Stories of America's Children in Foster Care, a book narrating the life stories of five young adults from North Carolina, California and Illinois who overcame heavy odds to survive their childhood in foster care. Publishers Weekly called it an "eloquent and harrowing study," and "an excellent expose of a system that hurts those it is charged to help."

Five years later, Toth released another narrative about a young man, "What Happened to Johnnie Jordan: The Story of a Child Turning Violent," that once again pierced the secrecy surrounding foster care and juvenile services, this time in Toledo, Ohio. In its review, The New Yorker wrote: "In accounts of dysfunctional families, children are often the victims of violence; here, though, a child is both victim and perpetrator. The child in question is Johnnie Jordan, a fifteen-year-old Ohioan who brutally murdered his foster mother in 1996, hacking her to death with a hatchet and then setting her on fire. Through a series of interviews with Jordan, his foster father, and others within the child-welfare system, Toth constructs an agonizing portrait of a boy who was repeatedly abused from a very young age and repeatedly failed by the system responsible for protecting him."

Controversy
Cecil Adams' The Straight Dope, a widely read question and answer column, devoted two columns to the Mole People dispute. The first, published on 9 January 2004 after contact with Toth, noted the large amount of unverifiability in Toth's stories while declaring that the book's accounts seemed to be truthful. The second, published on 9 March 2004 after contact with Joseph Brennan, was more skeptical.

Documentation of the individuals and locations described in The Mole People have been repeatedly catalogued in a variety of other media, from photographer Margaret Morton's The Tunnel (Yale University Press: 1995) to the New York Times to the "Jerry Springer Show," which featured one of the main characters, Bernard Isaacs, the self-proclaimed Lord of the Tunnels.

Bibliography 
 The Mole People: Life in the Tunnels Beneath New York City (1993)
 Orphans of the Living: Stories of America's Children in Foster Care (1997)
 What Happened to Johnnie Jordan?: The Story of a Child Turning Violent (2002)
 Bajo El Asfalto (Spanish translation of The Mole People) (2001)

See also
 Voices in the Tunnels

References

External links
 Views of Freedom Tunnel, which is featured in her book
 Are there really "Mole People" living under the streets of New York City?, The Straight Dope, 9 January 2004
 The Mole People revisited, The Straight Dope, 5 March 2004
 

Living people
Year of birth missing (living people)